"Niagara Falls" is the fourth single released by the American rock band, Chicago, from their 1986 album, Chicago 18. Lead vocals were shared by Jason Scheff and Bill Champlin. 

Following the successful singles, "Will You Still Love Me?" (#3 US pop) and "If She Would Have Been Faithful..." (#17 US pop), "Niagara Falls" only reached #91 on the Billboard Hot 100 pop singles chart.

Video
Like the majority of Chicago's music videos from the late 1980s, the video for "Niagara Falls" featured various people shown throughout, with the main storyline revolving around a couple trying to make things work. The band itself never appears.

References

1987 singles
Chicago (band) songs
Songs written by Steve Kipner
Song recordings produced by David Foster